The enzyme cephalosporin-C deacetylase (EC 3.1.1.41) catalyzes the reaction

cephalosporin C + H2O  deacetylcephalosporin C + acetate

This enzyme belongs to the family of hydrolases, specifically those acting on carboxylic ester bonds.  The systematic name is cephalosporin-C acetylhydrolase. Other names in common use include cephalosporin C acetyl-hydrolase, cephalosporin C acetylase, cephalosporin acetylesterase, cephalosporin C acetylesterase, cephalosporin C acetyl-esterase, and cephalosporin C deacetylase.  This enzyme participates in penicillin and cephalosporin biosynthesis.

Structural studies

References

 

EC 3.1.1
Enzymes of known structure